The Harvard Crimson softball team represents Harvard University in NCAA Division I college softball.  The team participates in the Ivy League. The Crimson are currently led by head coach Jenny Allard. The team plays its home games at Soldiers Field located on the university's campus.

History

Coaching history

Coaching staff

References

 
Sports clubs established in 1981
1981 establishments in Massachusetts